Forrest Alexander Gump is a fictional character and the title protagonist of the 1986 novel by Winston Groom, Robert Zemeckis' 1994 film of the same name, and Gump and Co., the written sequel to Groom's novel.

In the film, Forrest is a college football All-American running back, Vietnam veteran and Medal of Honor recipient, champion international ping pong player, businessman, and philanthropist whose accomplishments and pursuits bring him to experience critical events in the 20th century, and meet various significant people, including Elvis Presley, John Lennon, and U.S. Presidents John F. Kennedy, Lyndon B. Johnson, and Richard Nixon.

He exudes a compassionate, optimistic, and tenacious attitude in the face of countless setbacks. Thriving from the strong upbringing of his mother, he strives to help every person he meets despite his strong naïveté and some people's negative perception of him due to his lack of intellect. Throughout his life, he maintains a sincere love for his childhood friend Jennifer Curran, whom he affectionately calls Jenny and eventually comes to marry.

Tom Hanks portrayed the character in the film and earned his second consecutive Academy Award for Best Actor for his performance (Hanks won the previous year for Philadelphia), while Michael Conner Humphreys portrayed Forrest as a child.

In 2019, Forrest Gump was named the 27th greatest movie character of all time by Empire magazine.

Fictional character biography

Early years
Forrest was born near the small town of Greenbow, Alabama, on June 6, 1944. His father was absent during his life, and his mother said he was "on vacation". His mother named Forrest after their ancestor Nathan Bedford Forrest, a Scotch-Irish American and a noted Confederate general in the American Civil War and the first Grand Wizard of the Ku Klux Klan. She intended his name to be a reminder that "sometimes we all do things that, well, just don't make no sense".

Forrest was born with strong legs but a crooked spine. He was forced to wear leg braces which made walking difficult and running nearly impossible. He also had a relatively low I.Q. of 75, which nearly prevented him from being accepted into public school; his mother managed to get the principal to reconsider by letting him sleep with her. Despite his physical and mental challenges, Forrest's mother told him not to let anyone tell him he was different, telling him "stupid is as stupid does".

Forrest and his mother lived in a large house just outside the town of Greenbow in the state of Alabama. They made money by renting out rooms to travelers. One of their guests was a young Elvis Presley. Forrest liked dancing to Elvis' music and his leg braces gave him a unique dancing style that would inspire Elvis's "hip dancing", for his song "Hound Dog".

On the bus ride on Forrest's first day of school, Forrest met Jenny Curran and was instantly taken by her. "I had never seen anything so beautiful in my life," he would later say of her, "she was like an angel." The two became close friends, often playing around a large nearby tree. Forrest described their relationship saying, "Jenny and me was like peas and carrots." Jenny was one of the few people besides his mother to accept Forrest as he was, helping him learn to read and stand up to bullies who harassed him. However, Jenny's home life was not nearly as happy as Forrest's: her mother had died when she was five and her father was an alcoholic who molested and beat his children (until Jenny was taken away to live with her grandmother), and Forrest's friendship offered her an escape.

One day, a group of bullies were throwing rocks at Forrest, and one of them cut his forehead. Jenny told Forrest, "Run Forrest run!", which he did, only to prompt the bullies to chase him on their bikes. As Forrest struggled to run, his leg braces broke apart. Once he was free of them, Forrest was able to run incredibly fast. Forrest would never wear leg braces again, and was able to run anywhere he wanted to after that.

College
Forrest and Jenny remained close friends all the way through high school, though he remained a target for bullies. One day, while running from some bullies, he interrupted the local high school's football practice by running across the field faster than all the players. This feat caught the attention of Alabama Crimson Tide head football coach Paul "Bear" Bryant, who was at the practice scouting football players. After his incredible running ability impressed the coach, Forrest received a football scholarship to the University of Alabama, where his speed helped them win several games. He played for five years and wore jersey number 44, which is believed to be a reference to his birth year. He was later named to the All-American team and got to meet President John F. Kennedy at the White House. When asked by the President how he felt, Forrest (having consumed about fifteen Dr Pepper sodas) gave an honest answer: "I gotta pee."

Forrest was also present at the university when it was desegregated and observed Governor George Wallace's Stand in the Schoolhouse Door, denouncing the desegregation. While several citizens jeered the black students entering the campus, Forrest, not entirely understanding the situation, simply walked up to Vivian Malone and handed her a book she dropped, saying simply "Ma'am? You dropped your book...ma'am?" before following her and James Hood into school, causing his coaches to watch the incident in disbelief. Forrest later spends time with Jenny in her college dormitory during a rainy day, after she had been abused by another college boy.

In the Army

At his college graduation in 1966, Forrest was approached by an army recruiter who asked if he'd "given any thought to his future". Soon after, Forrest would join the United States Army. On the bus going to boot camp, Forrest met Benjamin Buford Blue, a young black man from Bayou La Batre, Alabama, who went by the nickname "Bubba". Bubba told Forrest about his family history of cooking shrimp and how he had planned to buy his own shrimping boat after getting out of the army. Bubba explains to Forrest that he loves all kinds of shrimp, and makes a long list of different types, with Forrest being the only one to really listen to him.

Forrest did well in the army as he followed orders well without distraction; for example, he set a new company record for assembling his M14 rifle with his drill sergeant, who regularly singled him out as an example for the other recruits, replying he would be an Army General. Meanwhile, while Jenny was having multiple relationships with different men, having been kicked out of school for wearing her school sweater to pose in Playboy, she had gotten work singing in the nude at a strip club in Memphis, Tennessee under the stage name 'Bobbie Dylan'. Forrest goes to visit her at the club, and gets into a fight with some patrons who are harassing her during her performance. During an argument that takes place shortly after, Forrest tells Jenny that he loves her, but Jenny replies that he "doesn't know what love is". Jenny is angry, but later becomes concerned when he tells her he was being deployed to Vietnam to serve in the Vietnam War. Jenny tells him not to try being brave if he was ever in trouble and to just run away instead.

While in Vietnam, and assigned to company A, 2/47th Infantry, 3rd Brigade, 9th Infantry Division, Forrest and Bubba meet their platoon leader Lieutenant Dan Taylor, whom Forrest would refer to as "Lieutenant Dan". While on patrol, Bubba proposed that he and Forrest go into the shrimping business together after their time in the army was finished, and Forrest agreed.

After several uneventful months, their platoon was ambushed by the Viet Cong and several soldiers were wounded and killed. In the confusion, Forrest initially was ordered to retreat, and was separated from the rest of his platoon, but after becoming concerned for Bubba, he ran back to look for him. Forrest then found Lieutenant Dan and several other wounded soldiers and carried them to safety before continuing to look for Bubba. Forrest finally found Bubba badly wounded and managed to carry him away from the combat area before it was hit with napalm from an air strike. Sadly, Bubba died of complications from his wounds soon after. His last words were "I wanna go home."

Forrest himself was shot in the buttocks during the firefight and recovered in an army medical center in Saigon. Lieutenant Dan was in the bed next to his, having lost his legs because of his injuries. Lieutenant Dan later became angry at Forrest for cheating him out of his destiny to die in battle with honor (as several of his ancestors had) and rendering him disabled.

Washington, D.C.
Forrest later receives the Medal of Honor for his bravery in Vietnam. When being awarded, President Lyndon B. Johnson asked where he was hit and when Forrest told him, the President whispered in his ear, saying he'd like to see it someday. Forrest promptly lowered his trousers and turned to show him his wound (while on national TV). President Johnson simply smiles and walks away.

Shortly thereafter, Forrest went out sightseeing in Washington, D.C. and accidentally found himself among a group of veterans attending an anti-war rally led by Abbie Hoffman. While making a speech at the rally that was rudely cut off by a policeman, he was reunited with Jenny, who had since become a hippie. Forrest was less enamored with her new boyfriend Wesley, the president of the SDS at Berkeley, and beat him up after he saw him hit Jenny during an argument at a Black Panther Party gathering. Forrest and Jenny stayed up all night while Jenny told Forrest of her travels. Before they went their separate ways again in the morning, Forrest gave Jenny his Medal of Honor, saying "I got it just by doing what you told me to do," since Jenny told him to just run away instead of being brave in combat.

Ping Pong and New York City
In 1969, Forrest joined the Army Special Services, where he entertained wounded military veterans with his Ping-Pong skills. His exceptional skills earned him a place in the All-American Ping Pong team, with whom he traveled to China during the Ping Pong Diplomacy period of the early 1970s. Upon his return, Forrest was a national celebrity, "famous-er even than Captain Kangaroo", and was invited to New York City by Dick Cavett to appear on The Dick Cavett Show, where John Lennon was also a guest at the time. Hearing Forrest talking about the Chinese having "no possessions" and "no religion" during his interview with Dick would eventually inspire John Lennon to write the song "Imagine".

Soon after, Forrest reunites and stays with Lieutenant Dan, his platoon leader from Vietnam and now using a wheelchair, over the winter holidays. Dan has since become an alcoholic who has lost all faith in God, and was dismayed that such an "imbecile" like Forrest could earn the Medal of Honor and humiliate himself on national television. During a New Year's Eve celebration in 1971, Forrest persuades Lieutenant Dan to join him in the shrimping business as his first mate, in an effort to fulfill his promise made to Bubba earlier in Vietnam. Dan later invites two prostitutes, Carla and Lenore, to his New Year's Day party, both of whom he eventually kicked out of his apartment for insulting Forrest when Forrest rejected their advances. Forrest apologizes to Dan for ruining his party, simply saying that the prostitutes "smelt like cigarettes", to which Dan replied by simply wishing Forrest Happy New Year.

In June 1972, Forrest was invited with the US Ping Pong team to the White House, where he meets President Richard Nixon, who offers him a room to stay in at Watergate Hotel. That night, Forrest was awakened by a group of people with flashlights breaking into an unlit office. Mistaking it for a power outage, Forrest calls security guard Frank Wills to inform him about the break-in, inadvertently initiating the Watergate Scandal and leading to Richard Nixon's resignation in August 1974. In that same year, Forrest was honorably discharged from the Army with the rank of Sergeant.

Shrimping Boat Captain
Upon his return in August 1974, Forrest finds his Greenbow house filled with memorabilia capitalizing on his fame as a ping-pong player in China. At his mother's insistence, Forrest made $25,000 endorsing a brand of ping-pong paddles, and used most of the money to travel to Bubba's hometown of Bayou La Batre and purchase a boat. When someone pointed out it was bad luck to have a boat without a name, Forrest names his boat after Jenny, which he calls, "The most beautiful name in the whole wide world." Unbeknownst to Forrest, Jenny had descended into a life of drugs, burglary and sexual promiscuity at this point, but an event in which she nearly slips and falls off a balcony as she "contemplates" suicide while high on drugs in a Los Angeles apartment shakes her to her core.

Later Forrest was visited by Lieutenant Dan who, just as he said he would do on New Year's Eve of 1971, had come to be Forrest's first mate. For several weeks, the two had no luck catching shrimp. However, things changed when the area was hit by Hurricane Carmen. Forrest's boat was the only one left standing and they found themselves with a monopoly of shrimp. Under the name Bubba Gump Shrimp Company, they soon became very wealthy. Apparently having faced his demons during the storm, Lieutenant Dan thanked Forrest for saving his life in Vietnam, and Forrest assumes that Dan (without actually saying so) made peace with God.

Home in Alabama
Forrest returned home to Greenbow in September 1975 when he learned his mother was dying of cancer. After her death, Forrest stays and leaves his shrimping industry in the hands of Lieutenant Dan and retired to mowing and cutting grass and lawns, as he apparently enjoys doing it. Meanwhile, Lieutenant Dan participated in a substantial investment into what Forrest says to be "some kind of fruit company". In reality, the company was the fledgling Apple Computer. With the money he got from the Apple Computer investment, Forrest spent them on renovating the church he frequents, establishing a medical center at Bubba's hometown and gave Bubba's family Bubba's share of the investment money that is enough for them to never work again.

Jenny returned to Greenbow and moves in with Forrest. The two spent time together catching up, and Forrest later describes it as "the happiest time of [his] life again".  One day, they happen to walk past the now abandoned house that had belonged to Jenny's father. She stares transfixed for a moment, and then starts throwing every rock she can find at it, before collapsing in despair, and now Forrest truly understands the ordeal she had been through as a child. Another night, July 4, 1976, Forrest asked Jenny to marry him, but she turns him down, saying "You don't want to marry me." Forrest replies with, "Why don't you love me Jenny? I'm not a smart man, but I know what love is." After this exchange, Jenny comes to Forrest's bedroom, tells him she loves him, and the two make love. Wanting to restart on her own, Jenny hails a cab very early the next morning and leaves before he wakes up.

Running
Forrest's new-found loneliness leads him to take a run "for no particular reason". At first, he decides to run to the end of the road, then across town, then across the county, then all the way to the Mississippi border. Eventually, he criss-crosses the country several times over a span of three years. Forrest attracts media coverage, and eventually, dozens of followers initiating and inspiring what would become the jogging craze of 1978–81. Meanwhile, Jenny has taken a job as a waitress in Savannah, Georgia and sees news coverage of Forrest's run on television. During the run, he inspires the phrase "Shit happens" to a bumper-sticker salesman after stepping in a pile of dog droppings. He also uses a yellow T-shirt provided to him by a shirt designer to wipe off his face after being splattered by mud from a big rig. In the process, he forms the iconic "Smiley face" logo and tells the man "Have a nice day." One day, while running in the Western United States, Forrest suddenly stops; his followers all stop and listen on in anticipation, expecting him to offer words of wisdom, but instead he simply announces that he's tired, then turns around and walks back to Alabama, leaving his followers dumbfounded at his sudden decision.

Back to the present
Back to the present (the "present" in the film being 1981, as seen from a car and on a bus, and televised footage of Ronald Reagan's escape from assassination), Forrest tells his latest companion on the bench, an elderly woman, that he had recently received a letter from Jenny asking him to come see her. When told Forrest's destination, the old lady informs him that it is only 5 to 6 blocks away. Thanking her, Forrest sets off on foot towards Jenny's home.

Forrest and Jenny are happy to see each other. However, before they can do much catching up, Forrest is introduced to Jenny's young son, a bright young boy whom she named Forrest after him. Forrest at first thinks she met another man named Forrest, until she explains "You're his daddy, Forrest." Forrest's fearful inquiry as to Little Forrest's intelligence leads Jenny to quickly assert that he is completely normal. Forrest learns that Jenny is sick from an unknown virus (implied to be either HIV or Hepatitis C, as both were unknown diseases at that time) which has no known cure. He invites her and Little Forrest to come home and stay with him. She asks him to marry her and he accepts.

Forrest and Jenny's wedding is a quiet, intimate ceremony attended only by a handful of family and friends. Among the attendees is Lieutenant Dan, who has titanium prosthetic legs (claiming to be made of the same material as the Space Shuttle), with his Vietnamese fiancée Susan. It is the only time Jenny and Dan meet. Forrest, Jenny and Little Forrest only have a year together as a family before Jenny would pass away. It is implied by Forrest that she died on a Saturday, despite the date of death marked on her tombstone (March 22, 1982) being a Monday. Before she dies, she asked Forrest what it was like in Vietnam. He responded by saying that it was nice, and when it stopped raining, it would be quiet and peaceful. He also states that while running in Oregon, it looked as if there were two skies and two mountains (since there was a lake in front of the mountain). Forrest also states that while running in the desert, when the sun was rising, it was the most beautiful sight ever.

Jenny responds by saying that she wished she was there with him. Forrest smiles and says, "You were there with me". Forrest has her buried under the tree where they played as children, then buys her childhood home (where her father had abused her) and has it bulldozed. Though he misses Jenny terribly, Forrest becomes a good father to Little Forrest.

Visiting Jenny's grave one day in 1982, he reflects on the idea of fate and destiny, wondering if Lieutenant Dan was right about people having their own destiny, or if  his mother was right about description of life as floating around accidentally like on a breeze. Forrest eventually decides "maybe it's both, maybe both are happening at the same time." He leaves Jenny a letter from Little Forrest and tells her "If there's anything you need, I won't be far away."

Forrest is last seen outside his home, sitting where he and his mother sat waiting for the bus, seeing Little Forrest off on his bus ride to school, telling him that he loves him and that he will be waiting for him.

Awards and decorations

The following are the medals and service awards fictionally worn by Forrest during his time as a U.S. Army service member.

Differences from the novel

The portrayal of Forrest in the original novel differs from how he was portrayed in the film. In the novel, Forrest is shown to be somewhat cynical and abrasive, while in the film, he is more placid and naïve. The novel also describes him as being a savant with extraordinary talent in numerical calculation (as shown when he states the exact amount of time in years, months, days and hours that he spent running across the country). Other changes from the novel to the film include the deaths of Forrest's mother and his wife, Jenny, neither of whom died in the original book, although the sequel Gump & Co., written in response to the film, begins with both characters dying off-page. Whilst the film has him running around the country for over three long years, the novel sends him rocketing into space and later crash-landing in New Guinea and being captured by a tribe of cannibals.

The novel also provides additional backstory on his father. It is revealed that his father was a longshoreman who worked for United Fruit Company. He was killed when a crate of bananas being loaded off of a boat fell on top of him, crushing him to death. Forrest goes on a number of different adventures including being an astronaut, playing the harmonica in a band called the Cracked Eggs, becoming a professional wrestler ("The Dunce") and running for the United States Senate (with the campaign slogan "We Got to Pee").

References

Characters in American novels of the 20th century
Drama film characters
Fictional businesspeople
Fictional characters from Alabama
Fictional characters with musculoskeletal system disorders
Fictional characters with disfigurements
Fictional characters with intellectual disability
Fictional fishers
Fictional janitors
Fictional Medal of Honor recipients
Fictional male sportspeople
Fictional military captains
Fictional military sergeants
Fictional musicians
Fictional people from the 20th-century
Fictional philanthropists
Fictional players of American football
Fictional privates
Fictional professional wrestlers
Fictional runners
Fictional sea captains
Fictional sportspeople
Fictional United States Army personnel
Fictional Vietnam War veterans
Film characters introduced in 1994
Literary characters introduced in 1986
Male characters in film
Male characters in literature
Military humor